An earthquake measuring 4.4 MW on the moment magnitude scale struck  north-northeast of Decatur, Tennessee in the eastern part of the state on December 12, 2018 at 4:14 a.m. Eastern Standard Time. The earthquake occurred along the Eastern Tennessee Seismic Zone (ETSZ), a geographic band stretching from northeastern Alabama to southwestern Virginia that is subject to frequent small earthquakes. The earthquake was felt throughout the Southeast, primarily in eastern Tennessee and the Atlanta metropolitan area. While relatively minor, this earthquake was the largest to occur on the ETSZ since the 4.6 MW 2003 Alabama earthquake, the third largest to have been recorded in the area, becoming the fourth largest earthquake recorded in the region. Robert Sanders from the U.S. Geological Survey told WSB-TV that aftershocks would be possible throughout the day after the quake.

Geologic background
The ETSZ is one of the most seismically active areas in the relatively calm eastern United States. Most earthquakes that occur in the zone are small, measuring under 3 MW; however, earthquakes in the zone tend to be more felt more than earthquakes of similar intensity more seismically active places like the 
West Coast of the United States due to higher strength of in the rock in the East. Earthquakes also are felt over wider areas than those of similar intensity in the West.

Damage and effects
Damage was expected in the small towns near the quake's epicenter, but should not be considered catastrophic. The earthquake's epicenter was located two miles east of Watts Bar Nuclear Plant operated by the Tennessee Valley Authority. They reported that their facilities are designed to withstand seismic events and were not impacted by the earthquake, but personnel would conduct further inspections as a precaution.
The Tennessee Department of Transportation was not notified of any damages to bridges, but teams carried out inspections on them as a precautionary measure.

See also
List of earthquakes in 2018
List of earthquakes in the United States

References

External links

2018 earthquakes
2018
2018
2018
2018
2018
2018
December 2018 events in the United States